The American Independent Institute is a nonprofit organization which funds liberal investigative journalism efforts. According to the organization, its aim is to support journalism which exposes "the nexus of conservative power in Washington." The current institute, started by David Brock in 2014, is a relaunch of the former state-based digital news-gathering network known as the American Independent News Network.

History
The American Independent News Network was founded as the Center for Independent Media in 2006 by David S. Bennahum, a former journalist with Wired. The group had a stated mission of "investigating and disseminating news that impacts public debate and advances the common good." It operated a news network which consisted of state-based daily news sites The Colorado Independent, Florida Independent, Iowa Independent, Michigan Messenger, Minnesota Independent, New Mexico Independent, and Washington Independent. It changed its name to the American Independent News Network in 2010.

In 2011, the organization's founder, David S. Bennahum, departed the organization after shutting down most of the organization's state websites. The group peaked in traffic and revenues in 2009 and 2010 before both numbers dropped off considerably. By 2013, the American Independent News Network had shuttered all of it sites and gone on hiatus.

The Project for Excellence in Journalism of the Pew Research Center surveyed and analyzed nonprofit news organizations active on the state or national level in 2011 and again in 2013. The studies found that the most consistently ideological of the news outlets were those that were organized in networks, specifically the conservative Watchdog.org network and the liberal American Independent News Network. The 2011 study found that "the liberal American Independent News Network [doesn't] ... reveal much about who's paying their bills, and [its] work skews clearly in one direction, both in the topics [it covers] and the content of individual stories".

2014 relaunch
In 2014, the dormant American Independent News Network organization was re-launched by David Brock as the American Independent Institute, a journalistic grant-making entity focused on liberal investigative journalism. The Nation reported that year that Brock's newly relaunched group would disperse $320,000 in grants to "reporters investigating right-wing misdeeds."

References

External links
 

Non-profit organizations based in Washington, D.C.
501(c)(3) organizations
American news websites
2006 establishments in Washington, D.C.
American journalism organizations